Manuel 'Manu' Gavilán Morales (born 12 July 1991) is a Spanish professional footballer who plays as a forward for Hong Kong Premier League club Lee Man.

Club career
Born in Seville, Andalusia, Gavilán graduated from Real Betis' youth setup, and made his senior debut with the reserves in the 2008–09 season, in the Segunda División B. After attracting interest from Liverpool and other Premier League clubs, he joined Serie A's Bologna F.C. 1909 on 10 August 2010, for €350,000.

Gavilán played his first match as a professional on 18 January 2011, coming on as a substitute for Henry Giménez in the 77th minute of a 1–2 away loss against S.S.C. Napoli in the round of 16 of the Coppa Italia. He subsequently served loans at fellow Italians Piacenza Calcio, A.S.G. Nocerina and San Marino Calcio, only appearing regularly with the latter; he was released in June 2014.

On 6 August 2014, Gavilán returned to Spain and signed a three-year deal with Zamora CF in the third level. He scored his first goal for the team on 26 October, opening the scoring a 4–0 away win over Atlético Astorga FC.

In the following seasons, save for a brief spell in the Austrian Football Bundesliga with SV Ried, Gavilán continued to compete in the Spanish lower leagues, representing in quick succession CD Eldense, UE Llagostera, CD Guijuelo and CD Toledo. On 31 July 2019, after a two-week trial, he joined Hong Kong Premier League side Happy Valley AA, leaving on 28 May 2020 after it was decided his contract would not be renewed.

Gavilán signed with Kitchee SC of the same league on 1 June 2020.

On 31 May 2022, Gavilán left the club after finishing his contract.

On 29 July 2022, Gavilán joined Lee Man.

Honours
Kitchee
Hong Kong Premier League: 2019–20

Spain
UEFA European Under-17 Championship: 2008

References

External links

1991 births
Living people
Footballers from Seville
Spanish footballers
Association football forwards
Segunda División B players
Tercera División players
Betis Deportivo Balompié footballers
Zamora CF footballers
CD Eldense footballers
UE Costa Brava players
CD Guijuelo footballers
CD Toledo players
Serie C players
Bologna F.C. 1909 players
Piacenza Calcio 1919 players
A.S.G. Nocerina players
A.S.D. Victor San Marino players
Austrian Football Bundesliga players
SV Ried players
Hong Kong Premier League players
Happy Valley AA players
Kitchee SC players
Lee Man FC players
Spain youth international footballers
Spanish expatriate footballers
Expatriate footballers in Italy
Expatriate footballers in Austria
Expatriate footballers in Hong Kong
Spanish expatriate sportspeople in Italy
Spanish expatriate sportspeople in Austria
Spanish expatriate sportspeople in Hong Kong